Lawrence Jacquelin (July 13, 1923 – November 25, 1992) was an American NASCAR driver.

Life and career
Jacquelin was born on July 13, 1923, in New Haven, Connecticut.  He was a fan of car racing and a stunt driver with cars and motorcycles.  On September 14, 1952, Jacquelin competed in his first and only Cup Series event, at Langhorne Speedway, in Langhorne, Pennsylvania.  Starting 39th in the forty-four car field, Jacquelin fell out after 34 laps due to overheating problems, resulting in a 41st-place effort.  Shortly after, Jacquelin was struck with polio and only made a partial recovery.  In his later years the lingering effects of polio worsened and finally took his life.

References

External links
 Lawrence Jacquelin at ESPN

1923 births
1992 deaths
Burials in Connecticut
Deaths from polio
Infectious disease deaths in Connecticut
NASCAR drivers
Sportspeople from New Haven, Connecticut
Racing drivers from Connecticut